Deborah Joy Cheetham Fraillon  (born 24 November 1964), is an Aboriginal Australian soprano, actor, composer and playwright. In February 2023 she was appointed a professor at the Sydney Conservatorium of Music.

Early life and education
Cheetham is a member of the Stolen Generations; she was taken from her mother when she was three weeks old and was raised by a white baptist family. Jimmy Little was her uncle.

Cheetham graduated from the NSW Conservatorium of Music with a Bachelor of Music Education Degree.

Career
In 1997 Cheetham wrote the autobiographical play White Baptist Abba Fan which tells of her experiences of coming to terms with her homosexuality and racial identity while trying to reunite with her Aboriginal family. White Baptist Abba Fan has toured internationally.

As a soprano, Cheetham has performed in France, Germany, Switzerland, the United Kingdom and New Zealand. She sang at the opening ceremonies of the 2000 Summer Olympics and the 2003 Rugby World Cup.

In October 2010, Cheetham's opera Pecan Summer, based on the 1939 Cummeragunja walk-off, opened in Mooroopna, Victoria. She wrote, composed and performed in the production by the Short Black Opera Company.

Cheetham has advocated for the lyrics to "Advance Australia Fair" to be rewritten.

In 2018 Cheetham was one of 52 people who contributed to Anita Heiss's book Growing Up Aboriginal In Australia, along with Adam Goodes, Miranda Tapsell and Celeste Liddle.

Cheetham wrote Australia's first requiem based on the frontier wars between first nations people in South Western Victoria and settlers between 1840–1863. The requiem, "Eumeralla, a war requiem for peace" is sung entirely in the Gunditjmara language. The first performance of the requiem on 15 June 2019 featured Cheetham with the Melbourne Symphony Orchestra, the MSO Chorus and the Dhungala Children's Choir.

In November 2019, Cheetham was appointed Professor of Practice at the Sir Zelman Cowen School of Music at Monash University. She is also the 2020 Composer in Residence at the Melbourne Symphony Orchestra.

Cheetham's second opera, Parrwang Lifts the Sky, will premiere during Victorian Opera's 2021 season and will be sung in the Wadawurrung language.

Her work Ancient Land Processional performed in three indigenous languages, was commissioned by the University of South Australia and is performed at every graduation ceremony .

In 2022, a new short work, Ghost Light, was performed as part of the Sydney Symphony Orchestra's 50 Fanfares Project.

Cheetham was appointed to the Sydney Conservatorium of Music in February 2023 as the first person to hold the Elizabeth Todd Chair of Vocal Studies.

Personal life
Cheetham is openly lesbian. In 2022 it was announced that she was dating the conductor Nicolette Fraillon, and she is now known as Deborah Cheetham Fraillon after the pair married on 2 January 2023 at their home in Church Point, NSW. Previously, she had been in a long-term relationship with Toni Lalich, with whom she also enjoyed a lengthy artistic partnership.

Awards and honours 
In the 2014 Queen's Birthday Honours List, Cheetham was appointed an Officer of the Order of Australia (AO), for "distinguished service to the performing arts as an opera singer, composer and artistic director, to the development of Indigenous artists, and to innovation in performance".

In April 2018, the University of South Australia awarded Cheetham an Honorary Doctorate (D.Univ.) in recognition of her distinguished service to the community.

Australian Women in Music Awards
The Australian Women in Music Awards is an annual event that celebrates outstanding women in the Australian Music Industry who have made significant and lasting contributions in their chosen field. They commenced in 2018.

|-
| 2018
| Deborah Cheetham
| Auriel Andrew Memorial Award 
| 
|-
| 2021
| Deborah Cheetham
| Lifetime Achievement Award
|

Bernard Heinze Memorial Award
The Sir Bernard Heinze Memorial Award is given to a person who has made an outstanding contribution to music in Australia.

|-
| 2019 || Deborah Cheetham || Sir Bernard Heinze Memorial Award || 
|-

Helpmann Awards
The Helpmann Awards is an awards show, celebrating live entertainment and performing arts in Australia, presented by industry group Live Performance Australia (LPA) since 2001. In 2020, Cheetham received the JC Williamson Award, the LPA's highest honour, for their life's work in live performance.

|-
| 2020 || Deborah Cheetham || JC Williamson Award || 
|-

Music Victoria Awards
The Music Victoria Awards, are an annual awards night celebrating Victorian music. They commenced in 2005.

! 
|-
| 2021
| Deborah Cheetham (with Byron Scullin and Tom Supple)
| Best Experimental Act or Avant-Garde Act
| 
|
|-

National Live Music Awards
The National Live Music Awards (NLMAs) are a broad recognition of Australia's diverse live industry, celebrating the success of the Australian live scene. The awards commenced in 2016.

|-
| National Live Music Awards of 2019
| Deborah Cheetham
| Live Classical Act of the Year
| 
|-

Victorian Honour Roll of Women
The Victorian Honour Roll of Women was established in 2001 to recognise the achievements of women from the Australian state of Victoria. 

|-
| 2015  || Deborah Cheetham || Victorian Honour Roll of Women || 
|-

References

Living people
People from Nowra
1964 births
Australian operatic sopranos
Indigenous Australian musicians
Australian lesbian musicians
Australian LGBT singers
Sydney Conservatorium of Music alumni
Officers of the Order of Australia
Members of the Stolen Generations
Australian musical theatre librettists
Australian opera composers
Australian women classical composers
Women opera composers
20th-century Australian LGBT people
21st-century LGBT people